Let Them Talk is the debut studio album by English actor and musician Hugh Laurie.

The album, which consists of classic blues songs, was released on 9 May 2011. Some of the songs are collaborations with well-known artists such as Tom Jones, Irma Thomas and Dr. John. Laurie plays piano and guitar on the album in addition to providing lead vocals. Kevin Breit plays guitar and Vincent Henry plays saxophones. The album was produced by Joe Henry and features horn arrangements by Allen Toussaint.

Laurie premiered some of the songs in a small New Orleans club in March 2011, and started officially touring with these materials in April 2011 with two consecutive live concerts in Germany. In the UK, he performed at the Union Chapel in London, at the Cheltenham Jazz Festival, Warwick Arts Centre in Coventry, and at Manchester's Royal Northern College of Music. Laurie also made several television appearances, including BBC2 programmes The Graham Norton Show and Later... with Jools Holland, and was interviewed on BBC Radio 2's Chris Evans Breakfast Show.

On 15 May 2011, Laurie appeared in the UK ITV series Perspectives, explaining his love for the music of New Orleans and playing music from the album, at studios and live venues in the city of New Orleans itself.

A special edition of the album, containing three more songs, was released on 15 May 2011. A second blues album, named Didn't It Rain, was released on 6 May 2013.

Critical reception
The album received favourable reviews, and holds a Metacritic score of 61 out of 100, based on 9 reviews, indicating "generally favorable" reviews. It also received a positive review in The Independent.

Chart performance
Let Them Talk was the biggest-selling blues album of 2011 in the UK, with sales of 192,000 copies.

Track listing

Charts and certifications

Weekly charts

Year-end charts

Certifications

Release history

References

External links
Promotional video on Laurie's official YouTube channel

2011 debut albums
Hugh Laurie albums
Albums produced by Joe Henry
Warner Records albums